Live from Earth is the first live album by American rock singer Pat Benatar, and was released in October 15, 1983. The album was recorded during Benatar's sold out 'Get Nervous' world tour in late 1982 and early 1983. It also contains two studio tracks, "Love Is a Battlefield" and "Lipstick Lies", which were produced by Neil Giraldo and Peter Coleman. The album peaked at No. 13 on the Billboard 200 albums chart and shipped more than a million copies. "Love Is a Battlefield" was an international hit single and garnered Benatar her fourth consecutive Grammy Award for Best Female Rock Vocal Performance in 1984.

A concert from the same tour was filmed for a HBO special and released on VHS in 1985 with the title In Concert, but with a different and expanded track listing. The footage was re-released on VHS with the title Benatar the same year and in 1998 on DVD as Live in New Haven, without the last two tracks.

Track listing 
Side one
"Fire and Ice" (Tom Kelly, Scott St. Clair Sheets, Pat Benatar) – 3:46
"Lookin' for a Stranger" (Franne Golde, Peter McIan) – 3:28 
"I Want Out" (Neil Giraldo, Billy Steinberg) – 4:05 
"We Live for Love" (Giraldo) – 3:39 
"Hell Is for Children" (Giraldo, Benatar, Roger Capps) – 6:06

Side two
"Hit Me with Your Best Shot" (Eddie Schwartz) – 3:07
"Promises in the Dark" (Giraldo, Benatar) – 5:14
"Heartbreaker" (Geoff Gill, Clint Wade) – 4:21 
"Love Is a Battlefield" (Mike Chapman, Holly Knight) – 5:23  (studio recording)
"Lipstick Lies" (Giraldo, Myron Grombacher) – 3:51  (studio recording)

VHS track listing
"Anxiety (Get Nervous)”
"Fire and Ice"
"You Better Run"
"Little Too Late"	
"Fight It Out"
"Looking for a Stranger"	
"I Want Out"	
"We Live for Love"	
"In the Heat of the Night"	
"Shadows of the Night" 	
"Heartbreaker"
"Hit Me with Your Best Shot"	
"Hell Is for Children"	
"Little Paradise" 	
"Love Is a Battlefield" (video)

Personnel
Pat Benatar – vocals
Neil Giraldo – guitar, backing vocals
Charlie Giordano – keyboards
Roger Capps – bass guitar, backing vocals
Myron Grombacher – drums

Production

Live recordings
Neil Giraldo – producer, mixing
Guy Charbonneau – engineer, mixing
Cliff Bonnell, Andy Rose, Tim Wybrow, Bobby Ainsworth – assistant engineers

Studio recordings
Neil Geraldo, Peter Coleman – producers, mixing
Dave Hernandez – assistant engineer
Steve Hall – mastering

Video recordings
Marty Callner – director
Molly Miles – additional directing
Rick Newman, Richard Fields – producers
Neil Giraldo – audio producer
Karen Glass – associate producer
Bob Giraldi – "Love Is a Battlefield" video director

Charts

Weekly charts

Year-end charts

Certifications

References

Bibliography

 

1983 live albums
1983 video albums
Chrysalis Records live albums
Live video albums
Pat Benatar albums